The Battle of Nauheim (also known as the Battle of the Johannisberg or Johannesberg) was a battle of the Seven Years' War fought near Nauheim in the Landgraviate of Hessen-Kassel on 30 August 1762.  French troops under the command of Louis Joseph, Prince of Condé defeated Hanoverian and British troops under the command of Duke Ferdinand of Brunswick.

References
Biography of the Marquis of Granby
Jomini, Henri; Traité des grandes opérations militaires, 2ème édition, 4ème partie, Magimel, Paris: 1811, pp. 182–183
Mauvillon, I.; Geschichte Ferdinands Herzogs von Braunschweig-Lüneburg, Part 2, Leipzig: 1794, pp. 245–249
Pajol, Charles P. V., Les Guerres sous Louis XV, vol. V, Paris, 1891, pp. 421–426

Nauheim
Battles of the Seven Years' War
Battles involving France
Battles involving Great Britain
Nauheim
Battle of Nauheim
Battles in Hesse